Manuel Cruz was a Mexican boxer. He competed in the men's middleweight event at the 1932 Summer Olympics. At the 1932 Summer Olympics, he lost to Carmen Barth of the United States.

References

Year of birth missing
Year of death missing
Mexican male boxers
Olympic boxers of Mexico
Boxers at the 1932 Summer Olympics
Place of birth missing
Middleweight boxers